Heterolebes is a genus of trematodes in the family Opecoelidae.

Species
Heterolebes buckleyi (Gupta, 1968) Cribb, 2005
Heterolebes diodonti Parukhin, 1970
Heterolebes dongshanensis Liu, 1999
Heterolebes immaculosus Ku & Shen, 1965
Heterolebes maculosus Ozaki, 1935
Heterolebes sinensis Gu & Shen, 1979
Heterolebes spindalis Gupta, 1968
Heterolebes yamagutii Manter & Pritchard, 1962

References

Opecoelidae
Plagiorchiida genera